Indefatigable arrived at Hobart Town in 1812 and was the first vessel to transport convicts to Van Diemen's Land (now Tasmania). There was a break until 1818 when Minerva arrived. Thereafter one or more vessels arrived each year until 26 May 1853 when St Vincent became the last to arrive. In some cases the vessels concerned simply transferred convicts from Port Jackson.

A

B

C

D

E

F

G

H

I, J, & K

L

M

N, O, & P

R

S

T, W, & Y

References
 

 
Convictism in Tasmania